Hong Kah Constituency (Traditional Chinese: 丰加單選區; Simplified Chinese: 丰加单选区) was a single member constituency within Jurong, Singapore. It was formed by carving out areas from Boon Lay Constituency. It existed for a single electoral term from 1984 to 1988. Yeo Cheow Tong was the only Member of Parliament for the SMC from 1984 to 1988. In 1988, it was absorbed into Hong Kah Group Representation Constituency.

Member of Parliament

Elections

Elections in 1980s

References

Subdivisions of Singapore